Sigrid Halvorsen (born 20 May 1941) is a Norwegian handball player. She played 84 matches for the Norway women's national handball team between 1964 and 1973.  She participated at the 1971 and 1973 World Women's Handball Championship.

References

External links

1941 births
Living people
Norwegian female handball players
20th-century Norwegian women